Abd al-Rahman ibn Khalid ibn al-Walid (616–666) was the governor of Homs under caliphs Uthman and Mu'awiya I. During Mu'awiya's governorship of Syria (639–661), Abd al-Rahman commanded a number of campaigns against the Byzantine Empire and defended the Upper Mesopotamian frontier from the Iraq-based forces of Caliph Ali. He fought reputably against the latter at the Battle of Siffin in 657 and continued his governorship of Homs and campaigns against the Byzantines after Mu'awiya became caliph in 661. His battlefield reputation and descent from his father, the prominent general Khalid ibn al-Walid, made him particularly popular among the Arabs of Syria. Mu'awiya ultimately perceived him as a potential rival of his own son Yazid, who he was grooming as his successor, which led the caliph to allegedly order Abd al-Rahman's poisoning in 666.

Life 

Abd al-Rahman's mother was Khalid's wife Asma, the daughter of Anas ibn Mudrik, a prominent chieftain and poet of the Khath'am tribe who was active during the pre-Islamic period and died several years after the advent of Islam in the 620s. Abd al-Rahman likely entered military service during the caliphate of Uthman. During Uthman's reign, he was appointed the governor of Jund Hims (military district of Homs) by Mu'awiya ibn Abi Sufyan, the overall governor of the province of Syria. Abd al-Rahman was dispatched by Mu'awiya to command a number of military campaigns against the Byzantines in Anatolia and was referred to in the Greek sources "Abderachman". He fended off a raid against Mu'awiya's territory in the Jazira (Upper Mesopotamia) by the Iraqi forces of Caliph Ali in 657. Later that year, Abd al-Rahman served as a commander in the Syrian army of Mu'awiya against Ali at the Battle of Siffin, where he fought with distinction and held the banner of the Syrians. His brother Muhajir fought for Ali's side in the same battle and was killed. During the subsequent arbitration talks in Adhruh or Dumat al-Jandal in 658 or 659 between the representatives of Ali and Mu'awiya, Abd al-Rahman was among those in the latter's faction to witness the arbitration document.

Abd al-Rahman continued as governor of Jund Hims during the caliphate of Mu'awiya beginning in 661. In 664/665 and 665/666, he led the winter campaigns against the Byzantines along the Anatolian front. According to the Muslim traditional sources, Abd al-Rahman posed a threat to Mu'awiya's ambitions to appoint his own Yazid as his successor and the caliph resolved to eliminate him. At the time, he was the last surviving son of Khalid ibn al-Walid and his descent from the reputable general, as well as his own valor and effectiveness fighting the Byzantines, had endeared him to the Syrian Arabs. To that end, Mu'awiya allegedly had his Christian physician, Ibn Uthal, poison Abd al-Rahman upon the latter's return to Homs from the Byzantine front in 666. The physician was later killed by a kinsman of Abd al-Rahman called Khalid, who was either his son or the son of his brother Muhajir. This Khalid was consequently imprisoned and fined Ibn Uthal's blood money by Mu'awiya to protect him from potential retaliation. Relations between the influential Banu Makhzum, who were mostly concentrated in the Hejaz (western Arabia), and Mu'awiya deteriorated as a result of Abd al-Rahman's alleged poisoning. The Orientalist historian Henri Lammens doubts the reliability of the narrative, which he relates to the anti-Christian violence in Homs around that time. Abd al-Rahman's son Khalid was a commander of a naval campaign against the Byzantines in 668 or 669.

The line of Khalid ibn al-Walid died out with the deaths of Abd al-Rahman's roughly forty male descendants as a result of a plague in Syria toward the end of the Umayyad period (661–750). Abd al-Rahman is buried alongside his father and one of his father's wives, Fadda, in Homs. In 1908, the Ottoman rulers of Syria built the Khalid ibn al-Walid Mosque around the site claimed since at least the 12th century to contain their graves.

See also
Taba'een

References

Bibliography

 

 

616 births
666 deaths
7th-century Arabs
7th-century people from the Umayyad Caliphate
Banu Makhzum
Deaths by poisoning
Umayyad people of the Arab–Byzantine wars
People of the First Fitna
Tabi‘un
Umayyad governors of Hims
Umayyad governors of Ta'if